Leslie "Les" M. Thomas (birth year unknown) is a Welsh former rugby union, and professional rugby league footballer who played in the 1940s.

International honours
Les Thomas represented Wales XV (RU) while at Oldham (RL) in the 'Victory International' non-Test match(es) between December 1945 and April 1946, and won caps for Wales (RL) while at Oldham in 1947 5-caps, and won a cap for Great Britain (RL) while at Oldham in 1947 New Zealand.

Six rugby league footballers represented Wales XV (RU) while at rugby league clubs, they were; Tyssul Griffiths, Elwyn Gwyther, Gomer Hughes, Hugh Lloyd-Davies, Harold Thomas, and Leslie Thomas.

Gomer Hughes, and Harold Thomas had previously won Wales (RU) caps, but the other footballers hadn't, and having already changed to the rugby league code they were unable to do so, but Tyssul Griffiths, Elwyn Gwyther, Leslie Thomas, did go on to win Wales (RL) caps.

References

External links
!Great Britain Statistics at englandrl.co.uk (statistics currently missing due to not having appeared for both Great Britain, and England)
(archived by web.archive.org)  Welsh stars still had a rugby ball in wartime
Statistics at orl-heritagetrust.org.uk
Search for "Thomas" at espnscrum.com
Photograph of Les Thomas

Footballers who switched code
Great Britain national rugby league team players
Possibly living people
Llanelli RFC players
Oldham R.L.F.C. players
Place of birth missing
Rugby league second-rows
Wales international rugby union players
Wales national rugby league team players
Welsh rugby league players
Welsh rugby union players
Year of birth missing